Research Institute for Aquaculture No 1, or RIA1, is a government organization under the Fisheries Ministry of Vietnam. RIA1 is responsible for carrying out basic and applied research programs for inland, coastal, and marine aquaculture, including involvement in planning and development activities. RIA1 is now considered a national multifunction institute dealing with research, education, and extension in aquaculture and aquatic resources management. The Institute also plays an advisory role for many other aquaculture development projects.

RIA1 was established in 1963 initially as a freshwater fish research centre.

RIA1 is an R&D aquaculture centre in the Network of Aquaculture Centres in Asia-Pacific.

External links
 Official website (English version)

References

Fisheries and aquaculture research institutes
1963 establishments in Vietnam